Beware of the Car (translit. Beregis Avtomobilya, English titles Uncommon Thief, or Watch out for the Automobile) is a 1966 Soviet crime comedy drama film directed by Eldar Ryazanov, based on a screenplay by Emil Braginsky and produced by Mosfilm. It stars Innokenty Smoktunovsky, Oleg Yefremov, Andrei Mironov and Anatoli Papanov, among others. Beware of the Car is recognized as a satire of the film noir genre, highly unusual in Brezhnev--era society. It is credited for launching Soviet political satire as a film genre, typified by Ryazanov's work.

Plot 
Yuri Detochkin (Smoktunovsky) is a humble Soviet insurance agent who steals fancy cars from corrupt Soviet officials and scammers, disappointed by the militsiya being unable to fight the crooks. One of Detochkin's victims is Dima Semitsvetov (Mironov), a retail embezzler mocked but tolerated by his colorful father-in-law Semyon Vasilyevich (Papanov), a retired Soviet Army officer. Dima has a dacha (registered to his father-in-law) and a Volga car (registered in his wife's name). Meanwhile, Yuri is a commitmentphobe who has been courting his bus-driver girlfriend for years without settling down with her. In his spare time, Yuri is an amateur actor, and in his latest play, a production of Hamlet, he is playing alongside his friend, Detective Maksim Podberyozovikov (Yefremov). Not knowing who the car thief is, Detective Podberyozovikov investigates the missing cars. When he realises who is stealing them and why, the detective faces a serious moral problem, as he discovers that Detochkin has sold the cars and anonymously transferred the proceeds to the accounts of various orphanages.

Cast
 Innokenty Smoktunovsky as Yuri Detochkin
 Oleg Yefremov as Maksim Podberyozovikov
 Lyubov Dobrzhanskaya as Detochkin's mother
 Olga Aroseva as Lyuba
 Andrei Mironov as Dima Semitsvetov
 Anatoli Papanov as Semyon Vasilyevich
 Tatyana Gavrilova as Inna
 Georgiy Zhzhonov as a Militsiya officer
 Yevgeny Yevstigneyev as an acting coach
 Donatas Banionis as a priest
 Lyubov Sokolova as a judge
 Vyacheslav Nevinny as a car mechanic
 Gotlib Roninson as Yakov Mikhailovich
 Galina Volchek as a customer
 Sergey Kulagin as Philippe Cartuzov
 Yakov Lents as a tobacconist salesman
 Nikolay Parfyonov as a prosecutor
 Viktoria Radunskaya as Tanya
 Boris Runge as a man with suitcases
The author's narration was read by Yury Yakovlev.

Production 
The film's name is derived from traffic signs warning of locations where cars could potentially hit pedestrians or motorists, such as parking garages.
In the film, Detochkin and Podberezovikov act together in an amateur theatre which rehearses Hamlet – a play from Smoktunovsky's real-life acting career: he was reputed as the "best Hamlet on the Soviet stage" and starred in a celebrated film adaptation.

The waltz performed in the film is a distinguished melody composed by Andrey Petrov. Sergey Nikitin's repertoire includes a song named Glass Gentleman (lyrics by Yevgeny Yevtushenko), which used a waltz from the film.

All of the cars stolen by Detochkin are the GAZ-21 Volga model, the most prestigious Soviet car of the time. The GAZ-21 was the standard personal car for the Soviet elite, a satire element of the film which Ryazanov found very hard to get approved.

One scene featuring a petrol station includes American vehicles such as a 1955 Buick and a 1955 Oldsmobile. These were an extremely rare sighting for the location, since the United States had sanctions on the USSR and did not sell these cars within the Eastern Bloc.

Awards

The film was the leader of Soviet film distribution for 1966, viewed by 29 million people. Innokenty Smoktunovsky was recognized as the Best Actor of 1966.

The film won awards at the 1966 Edinburgh International Film Festival, 1966 Sydney Film Festival, 1967 Melbourne International Film Festival, and 1969 Cartagena Film Festival.

See also 
 Gone in 60 Seconds (1974 film), an American film that also focuses on an insurance agent who is secretly a car thief
Gone in 60 Seconds (2000 film), a loose remake of the 1974 film with different characters, including a detective who pursues the main character, whom he knows personally

References

External links

1966 comedy films
1966 films
1966 in the Soviet Union
1960s crime comedy films
1960s Russian-language films
Films about automobiles
Films directed by Eldar Ryazanov
Films scored by Andrey Petrov
Films set in the Soviet Union
Films shot in Moscow
Russian crime comedy films
Russian vigilante films
Soviet crime comedy films
Mosfilm films